Jain rituals play an everyday part in Jainism. Rituals take place daily or more often. Rituals include obligations followed by Jains and various forms of idol worship.

Jains rituals can be separated broadly in two parts: Karyn (obligations which are followed) and Kriya (worships which are performed).

Six essential duties
In Jainism, six essential duties (avashyakas) are prescribed for śrāvakas (householders). The six duties are:
Worship of Pañca-Parameṣṭhi (five supreme beings)
Following the preachings of Jain saints.
Study of Jain scriptures
Samayika: practising serenity and meditation
Following discipline in their daily engagement
Charity (dāna) of four kinds:
Ahara-dāna- donation of food
Ausadha-dāna- donation of medicine
Jnana-dāna- donation of knowledge
Abhaya-dāna- saving the life of a living being or giving of protection to someone under threat

These duties became fundamental ritual activities of a Jain householder. Such as spreading the grain for the birds in the morning, and filtering or boiling the water for the next few hours' use became ritual acts of charity and non-violence. Samayika was used as a word for all spiritual activity including icon worship during medieval times.

Samayika

Samayika is the practice of equanimity, translating to meditation.  It is a ritual act undertaken early in the morning and perhaps also at noon and night. It lasts for forty-eight minutes (Two Ghadis) and usually involves not only quiet recollection but also usually the repetition of routine prayers.
The ritual is chanting and also praying about the good things.

Pratikramana

Pratikramana is performed in the night for the repentance of violence committed during the night, and in the evening for the violence during the day and additionally on certain days of the year. During this, the Jain expresses remorse for the harm caused, or wrongdoing, or the duties left undone.

Annual and lifetime obligations
There are eleven annual obligations for a year and some obligations for once in a life which should be completed by Jain lay person individually or in a group. They are prescribed by Shravak Pragyapti.

11 annual obligations
They are following:
 Deva dravya : Fundraising for temples
 Mahapuja : Elaborate ritual in which temples and icons decorated and sacred texts recited 
 Ratri-jagarana : singing hymns and religious observance throughout night
 Sadharmik Bhakti: Deep respect to fellow follower of Jainism
 Sangha-puja: service to Sangha
 Shuddhi : confession of faults
 Snatra puja : a ritual related to Janma Kalyanaka
 Sutra-puja : veneration of scriptures
 Tirth prabhavana : promotion of Jainism. by celebrating important occasion
 Udyapana : displaying objects of worship and participant at end of religious activities
 Yatratnika or Yatratrik : Participation in religious festivals and pilgrimage to three sites

Obligations performed at least once in a lifetime
They are the following:
 Build a temple
 Celebrate renunciation of a family member
 Donate a Tirthankara icon to a temple
 Participate in Panch-kalyanak Pratishtha

Worship

Devapuja means worship of tirthankaras. It is usually done in front of images of any liberated soul (Siddha) such as Tirthankara, or Arihant. In Jainism, the Tirthankaras represent the true goal of all human beings. Their qualities are worshipped by the Jains.

Sthanakavasi oppose idol worship. They believe in meditation and silent prayers. Jain idols are seen as a personification of ideal state which one should attain.

During medieval period, worship of some Yaksha and Yakshini, heavenly beings who are not liberated souls, started. They are believed to help a person by removing obstacles in life.

Elaborate forms of ritual usually done in the temple. Jains wear clean three clothes for many rituals and enter temple with words related to respect for Tirthankara. He bows down to Tirthankara at main shrine and will circumambulate him three times.

Jain form of worship is also called Jain Puja. The worship is done in two ways:
 Dravya puja (worship with materials)
 Bhava puja (Psychic worship, no need of materials)

Jains worship the God, the scripture and the saint.

Dravya Puja
Dravya puja (worship with articles) includes Ashtaprakari Puja(means eight worships) which is done by paying homage with eight articles in prescribed way. It is also called archana: The following articles are used, in the Jaina Puja:

The combination of all the eight articles is called arghya. Of these, rice and coconut bits and almonds are to be washed and then all the articles are to be placed in a plate side by side, excepting water which is to be kept in a small pot separately. There should be provided a bowl for the pouring of water, another for the burning of incense, and a receptacle for lighting camphor.

After that some Jains also use Chamara (Whisk), Darpana (Mirror) and a Pankho (Hand fan) also for worship.

Bhava Puja

Bhava puja(means Psychic worship) is done by ritual called Chaitya Vandana. It includes number of prayers and rituals done in prescribed manner and positions.

Aarti and Mangal Deevo
Aarti and Mangal Deevo is a lamp ritual waving it in rotational manner in front of icons same as Hindu traditions. Lamps represent knowledge. It is performed everynight at all Jain temples.

Other forms
Many other forms of worships are mainly performed on special occasions.
Some forms of worships have close relationship with these five auspicious life events of Tirthankara called Panch Kalyanaka.
 Anjana Shalaka: It is a ceremony to install new Tirthankara icon. An Acharya recite mantras related to Panch Kalyanaka followed by applying special paste to eyes of Tirthankara icon. After this an icon becomes object of worship.
 Panch Kalyanak Pratishtha Mahotsava: When a new Jain Temple is erected, these Five Auspicious Life Events are celebrated known as Panch Kalyanak Pratishtha Mahotsava. After these an icons of Tirthankara gets a status of real Tirthankara which can be worshipped by Jains.
 Panch Kalyanak Puja:This ritual solemnizes all five Kalyanaka. It was narrated by Pandit Virvijay.
 Snatra Puja: Snatra Puja is a ritual related to birth of Tirthankara are bathed symbolising Indra doing Abhisheka on Tirthankara on Mount Meru after birth of Tirthankara. It performed before many other rituals and before starting of new enterprises, birthdays.

Others are:
 Adhara Abhisheka(18 Abhisheka: It is temple purification ceremony. 18 urns of different pure water, herbs etc. used to clean all icons for purification. It is performed periodically.
 Antaraya Karma Puja: It comprises a series of prayers to remove those karmas which obstruct the spiritual uplifting power of the soul.
 Arihanta Mahapujan: paying respect to the arihants.
 Aththai Mahotsava: It is religious celebration in which various religious activities are performed including some pujans for eight days.
 Shanti Snatra Puja: It is performed in intention of universal peace. It is related to Tirthankara Shantinath.
 Siddha-chakra Puja:It is a ritual focused on the Siddha-chakra, a lotus-shaped disc bearing representations of the arhat, the liberated soul, religious teacher, religious leader and the monk (the five praiseworthy beings), as well as the four qualities namely perception, knowledge, conduct and austerity to uplift the soul.

Observances
Both the Digambara and Svetambara celebrates eight-day observance (ashtahnika) thrice every year. It takes place every four months, from the eighth of bright half of the months of Ashadha (June-July), Karttika (October-November), and Phalguna (February-March) through the full moon and is in direct imitation of the eight day celebrations of Nandishvara Dvipa by the god.

See also
 God in Jainism
 Kshamavani
 Jain cosmology
 History of Jainism
 Jainism

References

Citations

Sources

External links

Religious rituals
Rituals